Cinzia Massironi (born October 28, 1966) is an Italian actress and voice actress. She was born in Legnano, and is a cousin of the actress Marina Massironi.

Massironi lent her voice to many Italian versions of cartoon or anime characters (both female and male), such as Dan Kuso in Bakugan Battle Brawlers, Caska in Berserk, Daichi in Beyblade G-Revolution, Chun Lee in Beyblade: Metal Masters, Li Syaoran in Card Captor Sakura, Mitsuhiko Tsuburaya in Detective Conan, Comet in Princess Comet, Laura and Videl in Dragon Ball, Haku in Naruto, Clancy Kanuka in Patlabor: The TV Series, Lady Kale in Princess Gwenevere and the Jewel Riders, and Jaden Yuki in the second season of Yu-Gi-Oh! GX.

In the field of video games, Massironi has lent her voice to Catwoman and Talia al Ghul in Batman: Arkham City, Lana Lei in Death by Degrees, Emily in Dishonored, Lachesis in God of War II, Hermione Granger in Harry Potter and the Deathly Hallows - Part 1, Michelle Chiang in Jet Li: Rise to Honor, female version of Commander Shepard in the Mass Effect series, Wonder Woman and Kitana in Mortal Kombat vs. DC Universe, Luke and Flora in the series Professor Layton, Talwyn Apogee in Ratchet & Clank: Tools of Destruction, Ingrid Hunnigan in Resident Evil 6, Lily in Vampire: The Masquerade - Redemption, and others.

Among the live-action film roles that Massironi dubbed in Italian are these of Rebecca De Mornay in The Shining and Alex Murrel in Laguna Beach: The Real Orange County. Massironi is also a theatrical actress, and worked with the italian comedy trio Aldo, Giovanni e Giacomo participating in the film Ask Me If I'm Happy (Chiedimi se sono felice) in the role of Francesca in 2000 and starred in the first part of the episodic film Il cosmo sul comò in 2008.

References

External links

1966 births
Living people
People from Legnano
20th-century Italian actresses
21st-century Italian actresses
Italian film actresses
Italian stage actresses
Italian voice actresses
Italian video game actresses